Amba (also known as Aba, Nembao or Nebao) is the main language spoken on the island of Utupua, in the easternmost province of the Solomon Islands.

Name
The speaker population calls their own language  (with prenasalised ). This name may be rendered Amba or Aba depending on spelling conventions, which have not been fixed yet for these languages.

This form, which may be spelled Nembao or Nebao, has sometimes been used by foreigners as another name for the Amba language.

References

Bibliography
.

Languages of the Solomon Islands
Temotu languages